Cossus Cornelius Lentulus was a Roman senator, who was active during the reign of Tiberius. He was consul in the year AD 25 as the colleague of Marcus Asinius Agrippa. Except for his consulship, the only office Lentulus might have held is governorship of Germania Superior, as Edmund Groag conjectured.

Lentulus was the son of Cossus Cornelius Lentulus Gaetulicus, consul in 1 BC. His brother was Gnaeus Cornelius Lentulus Gaetulicus, consul in the year 26. He is known to have a son, Cossus Cornelius Lentulus, consul in the year 60, as the colleague of Nero.

References 

1st-century Romans
Cossus (consul 778 AUC)
Cornelius Lentulus, Cossus (778 AUC)